Fondant potatoes, or pommes fondant, is a method of preparing potatoes that traditionally involves cutting them into cylinders, browning the ends, and then slowly roasting the potatoes in butter and stock.

See also
 List of potato dishes

References

Potato dishes
French cuisine